Mechelen (traditional English name: Mechlin) is a city and municipality in the province of Antwerp in the Flemish Region of Belgium.

Mechelen lies on the major urban and industrial axis Brussels–Antwerp, about 25 km from each city. Inhabitants find employment at Mechelen's southern industrial and northern office estates, as well as at offices or industry near the capital and Zaventem Airport, or at industrial plants near Antwerp's seaport.

Mechelen is one of Flanders' prominent cities of historical art, with Antwerp, Bruges, Brussels, Ghent, and Leuven.

History

Early ages 
Archaeological proof of habitation during the La Tène era in the triangle Brussels-Leuven-Antwerp, mainly concentrated around Mechelen which originated in wetlands, includes an 8.4-metre long canoe cut from an oak tree trunk and a settlement of about five wooden houses, at Nekkerspoel.

The area of Mechelen was settled on the banks of the river during the Gallo-Roman period as evidenced by several Roman ruins and roads. Upon Rome's declining influence, during 3rd–4th centuries the area became inhabited by Germanic tribes. A few centuries later Christianized assumedly by the Irish or Scottish missionary St Rumbold (Rombout in Dutch) who was also said to have built a monastery. Work on the cathedral that is dedicated to the saint started around 1200.

Antwerp lost profitable stapelrechten (rights as first seller) for wool, oats and salt to Mechelen in 1303 when John II, Duke of Brabant, granted City rights to the town. This started a rivalry between these cities that would last well into the 20th century.

15th Century and beyond 
In the 15th century, the city came under the rule of the Dukes of Burgundy, marking the beginning of a prosperous period. In 1473 Charles the Bold moved several political bodies to the city, and Mechelen served as the seat of the Superior Court until the French Revolution. In 1490, a regular postal service between Mechelen and Innsbruck was established.

The highly lucrative cloth trade gained Mechelen wealth and power during the Late Middle Ages and it even became the capital of the Low Countries (very roughly the Netherlands, Belgium and Luxembourg) in the first half of the 16th century under Archduchess Margaret of Austria.

During the 16th century the city's political influence decreased dramatically, due to many governmental institutions being moved to Brussels in 1530 and after the gunpowder magazine explosion of 1546. Mechelen compensated for this by increasing prominence in the religious arena: in 1559 it was proclaimed the Archdiocese of Mechelen, seat of religious authority over the territory that would eventually become Belgium. In 1961, "Brussels" was added to the title, resulting in the current Archdiocese of Mechelen-Brussels.

Mechelen also retained further relevance as the Great Council of Mechelen remained the supreme court of the territory until the French Revolutionary Wars. In 1572, during the Eighty Years' War, the city was burned and sacked by the Spanish during the Spanish Fury at Mechelen. After this pillaging, the city was rebuilt. It was sacked again in 1580 during the English Fury at Mechelen. It was during this time that the tradition of furniture making, still seen today, began.

In 1718 a major rebellion took place in the city, angry mobs entered the town hall. During this time Lord Pierre de Romrée was mayor of Mechelen. The chaos ended when the Emperor formally requested the President of the Great Council to restore peace. On 18 June, Christophe-Ernest de Baillet received a full list of the people who led the troubles. The President received the support of multiple regiments that had been sent by imperial command. After negotiations de Baillet restored peace and order in the city.

In 1781, Joseph II, Holy Roman Emperor, ordered the destruction of the city's fortified walls – their former location however continues to be referred to in the Latin terms intra muros (within the walls) and extra muros (outside), and meanwhile the site became that of the inner ring road.

The city entered the industrial age in the 19th century. In 1835, the first railway on the European continent linked Brussels with Mechelen, which became the hub of the Belgian railway network. This led to a development of metalworking industries, among others the central railway workshops which are still located in the town today. During the Second World War, the extensive Mechlinian railway structure had caused the Nazi occupation forces to choose Mechelen for their infamous transit camp. Over 25,000 Jews and Roma were sent by rail to the Auschwitz-Birkenau extermination camp from Mechelen. The site of the transit camp and a purpose-built complex across the public square, now house the Kazerne Dossin Memorial, Museum and Documentation Centre on Holocaust and Human Rights.

Several famous meetings on the Christian religion are connected to the name of the city. One in 1909 is thought to have inaugurated the Liturgical Movement. Between 1921 and 1925 a series of unofficial conferences, known as the Malines Conversations, presided over by Cardinal Mercier and attended by Anglican divines and laymen, including Lord Halifax, was the most significant of early attempts at the reconciliation between the Anglican and Roman Catholic Churches.

Folklore 

Most cities in Flanders have a mock name for their inhabitants. Since 1687, for their heroic attempt to fight the fire high up in the Saint-Rumbold's Tower, where the gothic windows had shown the flaring of only the moon between clouds, Mechlinians have been called Maneblussers (moon extinguishers).

Once every 25 years, a Parade, the Ommegang, commemorates both the arrival of Holy Roman Emperor Maximilian I, father of Archduchess Margaret of Austria, and also other major events of the city's past. The Ommegang had an extra edition in 2000 for the 500th anniversary of the birth of Charles V. This cortege shows the city's six 15th–17th-century Giants and other serious and humoresque puppets and carts, all typically made on a huge scale, and has been UNESCO Masterpiece of the Oral and Intangible Heritage of Humanity since 2005.

The city's 17th-century wooden mascot, which since 1775 has been called Opsinjoorke 'the doll', is pulled about on a sheet as part of the Ommegang. Nowadays, it is the replica that is so pulled around the city. A recent bronze statue depicting the Opsinjoorke stands in front of the Belfry.

The annual parade of carts decorated with flowers (comparable to that of Blankenberge for Mechlinian florists still prepare up to half of decorations), and with vegetables, – all of which are local to the area—has been indefinitely canceled since the beginning of the 21st century due to lack of financing by the City.

In spring, a legendary holy statue of Our Lady is the main feature in the Procession of Hanswijk.

Mechelen used to have its own newspaper called de Krijgstrompet, which was the official newspaper of the army.

Dialect
Informally, many Mechlinians (Dutch Mechelaars, locally pronounced Mecheleirs) speak Mechlinian (Mechels), a Dutch dialect which is distinct from other Brabantic dialects.

Since 1995, a subscribers' quarterly, De Mecheleir, shows old photographs of Mechelen and has stories on the local history, as well as a few columns written mimicking the dialect, for which there is no standard spelling.

Specialties 

Historically famous Mechlinian trades include laken (woollen cloth), tapestries, cordwain, Mechlin lace (precious bobbin lace, already from the early 18th century), wood carving and sculpturing, and furniture.

Mechelen was at the heart of the revival of the carillon in the early 20th century, and hosts its principal school in the world to this day.

The area around Mechelen is famous for the cultivation of vegetables, among which are Belgian endive (witloof), asparagus, and cauliflower. Founded in the city, the Mechelse Veilingen in neighbouring Sint-Katelijne-Waver is the largest co-operative vegetable auction in Europe.

One of the four breeds of the Belgian Sheepdog is the local Malinois. The Mechelse koekoek is a local poultry breed, fleshy chickens with black and white feathers which extend on the birds' legs, with colours reminiscent of a cuckoo, hence the name.

Mechelsen Bruynen was allegedly the emperor Charles V's favourite beer. A version is still brewed in the city at Het Anker brewery, one of the oldest breweries in Belgium.

Climate 
Mechelen has an oceanic climate (Köppen Cfb). Mechelen has a narrow temperature range between seasons for its high latitude, despite its inland position. Summers are warm and occasionally hot, whereas winters usually remain above freezing. Similar to Belgium as a whole, the climate is relatively cloudy and receives frequent rainfall, often light.

Sports 
Home of two old Belgian football clubs, founded in 1904: K.R.C. Mechelen and K.V. Mechelen. The latter contributed to the international glamour of the city by winning the UEFA Cup Winners' Cup and the European Super Cup in 1988. The number of lesser local teams shows this sport's popularity: Rapid Leest, Sporting Mechelen, Leest Utd., VV Leest, Walem, SK.Heffen, Zennester Hombeek, FC Muizen. In 1985, the city hosted the Canoe Sprint World Championships.

Main sights 

There are several important cathedral and churches in Mechelen. Most famous is Sint-Romboutskathedraal (St. Rumbold's Cathedral) with its dominating tower, which was consecrated in 1312 and is inscribed on the UNESCO World Heritage List as part of the Belfries of Belgium and France site. The domed, baroque Basiliek van Onze-Lieve-Vrouw-van-Hanswijk, a famous place of pilgrimage in Belgium, was designed by  native architect Lucas Faydherbe, some of whose sculptures can also be found in the cathedral and completed in 1876. The Kerk van Onze-Lieve-Vrouw-over-de-Dijle (Church of Our Lady across the river Dijle) and the Sint-Janskerk exhibits work from Rubens, including 'The Adoration of the Magi' and 'The Miraculous Draught of Fishes', respectively. Other important churches in Mechelen include the baroque Begijnhofkerk (Church of the Beguines, dedicated to St. Alexis and St. Catherine); the former Jesuit church Sint-Pieter en Pauluskerk (Saints Peter and Paul); and the present Jesuit Church of Our Lady of Leliendaal.

Other religious buildings in Mechelen include the Palace of the Archbishop of the Archbishopric of Mechelen-Brussels, still in use for its original purpose by the current Archbishop De Kesel. These palaces may not be open to the public in general but do offer a good external view. The Klein Begijnhof and the Groot Begijnhof (Small and Large Beguinages), which house lay religious women, form part of the Flemish Béguinages World Heritage Site. The grounds of the Theravada Buddhist place of worship Wat Dhammapateep (Temple of the Flame of Truth or Reality as taught by the Enlightened One) has since 2005 housed a green granite Buddha, sculptured in China, seated on a dark green granite socle – the tallest granite Buddha in Europe.

The Refuge of Grimbergen, the Refuge of Villers, the Refuge of Rozendaal, the Refuge of Sint-Truiden and the Refuge of Tongerlo, are retreat mansions for distant abbeys, the latter now housing the Manufacturer De Wit which restores the finest tapestries, for which Flanders was famous in the 16th century.

The Lakenhal (a cloth hall) and the 14th-century Belfry beside it are now incorporated with the modern City Hall complex on the main square. The hall and belfry are part of the Belfries of Belgium and France World Heritage Site for their civic importance and architecture. 

The Brusselpoort, the last remaining of the city's twelve gates was built in the 13th century. Along with the Schepenhuis, the oldest stone-built city hall in Flanders and the historical seat of the 'Grote Raad' (Great Council or Supreme Court), and the gothic-renaissance Hof van Busleyden where Hieronymus van Busleyden received Erasmus, Thomas More, and the later Pope Adrian VI, now house the City Museum. The Vismarkt (former fish market) is a 16th-century square located near the heart of the city along the river Dijle.

Many famous people resided in Mechelen in the 16th-19th centuries, and their houses still remain today. The Hof van Savoye was built for Margaret of Austria while as regent of the Netherlands still raising the later Charles Quint. It is one of the first Renaissance buildings north of the Alps and was converted to the meeting place of for courts of justice in 1609. In addition, Mechelen contains the "Hof van Nassau", a 15th-century building which served as temporary court of Margaret of York when she arrived in Mechelen after her marriage with Charles the Bold, as well as the palace she resided in after Charles's death.    

Other notable houses from the time period include:
 The "Hof van Hoogstraten", 16th-century palace of Antoon I van Lalaing
 The "Hof van Cortenbach", 16th-century building
 The "Hof van Coloma", 18th-century palace of Jean Ernest Coloma, Baron of St-Pieters Leeuw and member of the Coloma family

Mechelen also contains many museums, parks, and zoos:
 The Jewish Museum of Deportation and Resistance in a wing of the former Casern Dossin, built in the 18th century by Queen Maria Theresa of Austria, ruler of the Austrian Netherlands.
 Technopolis, center for hands-on Science and Technology.
 Mechelen Toy Museum at Nekkerspoel
 Planckendael Zoo in Muizen
 The Botanical Garden of Mechelen (Kruidtuin), a city park with marble statue of the 16th-century botanist Rembert Dodoens; Vrijbroek recreational park with around June its outstanding Rose Gardens and in summer its Dahlia Garden; the Tivoli Park with Children's Farm
The Clock Museum, also known as the Watchmakers' Museum

Mechelen also contains the Royal Carillon School "Jef Denyn" where carillonneurs come from around the world to study the carillon and to play the instrument.

Other sites in Mechelen include:
't Groen Waterke, a picturesque small remnant of bygone canals – in particular of the Melaan, of which a longer stretch was after more than a century uncovered in 2007.
A stone pillar De Mijlpaal, now prominent in front of the station, had marked the nearby destination point of the first passenger train ride on the continent. The name was adopted by the railway workers' club for miniature model trains, and by a small museum housed in one of the oldest railroad buildings commemorates the historical event and consequent local industry of national importance.

There are over 300 protected monuments in Mechelen.

Politics and government
The city council consists of 43 councillors, elected every six years. The mayor is Bart Somers (Open Vld) since 2001. In October 2019 Alexander Vandersmissen became acting mayor because Bart Somers became minister in the Flemish government, he retains the title of mayor. The Vld-Groen-M+ kartel got an absolute majority of seats in the October 2018 election.

The 2019-2024 city council, elected in October 2018, consists of:
 Vld-Groen-M+: 25 seats
 N-VA: 7 seats
 Vlaams Belang: 4 seats
 CD&V: 3 seats
 sp.a: 3 seats
 PVDA: 1 seat

Police
The city of Mechelen uses ANPR cameras since September 2011 to check all inbound and outbound cars against a database of stolen, non-insured and cars listed for other reasons.  In case of a positive match, an alarm is generated in the dispatching room, enabling the police to quickly intercept the car.  Mechelen was one of the first cities in Belgium to use ANPR on this scale. As of early 2012, 1 million cars per week are checked in this way. Mechelen started this project with SAIT Zenitel.

Mechelen and Willebroek form a unified local police zone since 1 January 2015.

People

Margaret of York, Duchess of Burgundy (1446–1503). Note: several children who later became queens of European countries had received an education at her court.
John Heywood, English poet (1497–c 1575)
Margaret of Austria, regent of the Netherlands, daughter of Maximilian I and guardian of Charles V (1480–1530)
Mary, Eleanor and Isabella of Austria, nieces of Margaret of Austria
Charles V, Holy Roman Emperor, brought up in Mechelen until age 17 (1500–1558)
Anne Boleyn, future wife of English King Henry VIII (1504–1536)
Rembert Dodoens, botanist, herbalist, and physician (1517–1585)
Philippe de Monte, Renaissance composer (1521–1603)
David Herregouts, painter (1603-?)
Rik Wouters, Painter and sculptor (1882–1916)
François René Mallarmé, French politician in exile (1755–1835)
Lodewijk van Beethoven (1712–73), grandfather of Ludwig van Beethoven, and the origin of the van Beethoven family
Jules Van Nuffel (1883–1953), choir conductor and composer
Hans Ruckers (1540s–1598), Virginal and Organ Builder
Adèle Colson (1905-1997), first woman in the world to earn a carillon certification
Gaston Relens (1909-2011), painter
Bart Somers (b. 1964), mayor who won the World Mayor Prize in 2016

Sister cities
 Sucre, Bolivia
 Dijon, France
 Yūki, Japan (1996)
 Helmond, Netherlands
 Sibiu, Romania
 Arvada, U.S.

Notes

References

Sources
, Michelin's "De Grote Gids België"

External links

 Official website – links to versions in  that are partially constructed (July 2011)
 Official Virtual Tour of the City of Mechelen
 Mechelen Mapt – an online wiki encyclopedia about Mechelen.

 Studies in Western Tapestry – The passion tapestries of Margaret of Austria (Guy Delmarcel)
 1775 Mechelen city plan  engraving by Berlin with c.1777  legend (map info)
  Restauratie Integratie Mechelen a local heritage conservation organisation (summary page)

 
 
Municipalities of Antwerp Province
Populated places in Antwerp Province
World Heritage Sites in Belgium